Kentam Product Limited is a Malawian pharmaceutical, and chemical manufacturing company that operates primarily in Malawi and is expanding internationally. Kentam's high demand products in Malawi are Kilpain (paracetamol), Ketaprin (aspirin), and Bufen (ibuprofen). These are high demand products in the Malawian market. Kentam serves mainly the private sector.

It was founded by Malawian pharmacist Dr.Kenneth Thindwa. The current general manager is Janet Thindwa.

Products
Kilpain (paracetamol)
Ketaprin (aspirin)
Bufen (ibuprofen)
Nutracid (Antacid)

Awards
Current Good Manufacturing Practices(CGMP)Award 2010- Pharmacy, Medicine, and Poisons Board, Malawi 
Best Manufacturer- Malawi International Trade Fair 2009

References

Pharmaceutical companies of Malawi